Linda MacDonald  born in Charlottetown, Prince Edward Island, Canada is a feminist grassroots activist against non-state torture, a human rights violation and crime.

She is a retired nurse living in Nova Scotia, Canada and the co-Founder of Persons Against Non-State Torture - a human rights advocacy self-funded campaign. MacDonald worked in hospitals, public health, and as care coordinator with home care. She is an networker, educator, researcher, author and a member of ACUNS.

She received her RN at the Victoria General hospital, Bachelor of Nursing degree at Dalhousie University and Masters of Education degree at St. Mary's University all in Halifax, Nova Scotia, Canada. 

MacDonald was featured on feminist Robin Morgan's radio show WMC Live. She works with Jeanne Sarson as a human right activist for girls and women who have endured NST.

She is the co-author, with Jeanne Sarson, of their book Women Unsilenced – Our Refusal To Let Torturer-Traffickers Win published by Friesen Press released in 2021.

References

External links
https://www.nonstatetorture.org/

Canadian activists
Living people
Year of birth missing (living people)